Molly Windsor (born 19 June 1997) is an English actress. Her breakthrough role was in the 2009 Channel 4 television film The Unloved, and has appeared in Oranges and Sunshine (2010), and The Runaways (2019). She is best known for her performance in the 2017 BBC miniseries Three Girls, for which she won the 2018 BAFTA TV Award for Best Actress, also being named In 2017, as a BAFTA Breakthrough Brit.

Early life
Windsor was discovered by the writer and director of BAFTA-winning The Unloved, Samantha Morton, in a local drama school and casting agency, Rama Young Actors. Windsor attended the Nottingham Actors Studio, a not-for-profit CIC organisation, and the Television Workshop, and has signed a contract with London-based talent agency, the Artists Partnership.

Career
Windsor's first professional acting role was in 2009 as Lucy Manvers in the television movie The Unloved at age 11. The Times described her character as "played with an unsettling stillness by Molly Windsor". 
She played Margaret's daughter in the 2010 film, Oranges and Sunshine. In 2017 she played Holly Winshaw in the BBC miniseries Three Girls, which was based on the Rochdale child sex abuse ring, and for which she won the 2018 BAFTA TV Award for Best Actress.
In 2017, Windsor was named as a BAFTA Breakthrough Brit, one of the 20 members from the film, television, and gaming industries. In 2019, she played Angie in The Runaways.

Filmography

Film

Television

References

External links

Photos on Channel 4 website
Discussion of The Unloved on Newsnight

1997 births
Living people
British television actresses
Actresses from Nottinghamshire
Best Actress BAFTA Award (television) winners